Bishop Oswald Lewis (born 30 July 1944) is the first Bishop of the newly created Roman Catholic Diocese of Jaipur.

Early life 
He was born in Kemmannu village of Udupi district of Karnataka state, India, on 30 July 1944.

Priesthood 
He was ordained a priest for the Roman Catholic Diocese of Lucknow on 30 December 1972.

Episcopate 
On 21 November 1997 he was appointed Coadjutor Bishop of the Roman Catholic Diocese of Meerut and ordained as a bishop on 16 April 1998.

He was appointed first Bishop of the Roman Catholic Diocese of Jaipur on 20 July 2005

References 

1944 births
20th-century Roman Catholic bishops in India
21st-century Roman Catholic bishops in India
Living people
People from Udupi district